Multiple elections were held in the Netherlands Antilles in 2010. These include:

2010 Netherlands Antilles general election, to elect the members of the Parliament of the Netherlands Antilles.
2010 Curaçao general election, to elect the members of the Parliament of Curaçao after dissolution of the Netherlands Antilles.
2010 Sint Maarten general election, to elect the members of the Parliament of Sint Maarten after dissolution of the Netherlands Antilles.